Mirpur DOHS is a neighborhood of Dhaka North, situated in Mirpur Thana of Dhaka City. The area is under the jurisdiction of Pallabi Thana Police Station.

The administration of the area is under the cantonment board.

The Neighborhood is located close to Mirpur Cantonment. The Postal Code for Mirpur DOHS is 1216.

History
The area is governed by Mirpur DOHS (Defence Officers' Housing Scheme) parishad. It is the largest DOHS in the country with a total of 1290 individual lots. The Government allocated 37 lots to the relatives of 37 officers killed in the BDR Mutiny and an additional 20 apartments were allocated to ten families, 2 each. In 2015 Bangladesh Police busted a human trafficking ring based in Mirpur DOHS, rescuing 46 victims.

Notable Places
Sarkar Bari Mosque
Mirpur DOHS central mosque
Mirpur Cantonment 
Bangladesh University of Professionals (BUP)   
Mirpur DOHS Mosque No. 3
Mirpur DOHS Shopping Complex
Mirpur Cantonment public school and college (MCPSC)
Military Institute of Science and Technology (MIST)
Play ground
New York Resttruent

References

Neighbourhoods in Dhaka
Dhaka
DOHSes in Dhaka